"Sancta Maria" is a Latin-language soprano aria based on the Intermezzo from the opera Cavalleria Rusticana, composed by Pietro Mascagni. It uses some of the same lyrics as Ave Maria and has become a popular concert piece. It also has been recorded by several singers, like Sissel Kyrkjebø, Charlotte Church, Katherine Jenkins and the tenors Andrea Bocelli and Friar Alessandro.

Text

Recordings
Sancta Maria by Andrea Bocelli, on the album Sacred Arias (1999)
Sancta Maria by Charlotte Church, on the album Prelude: The Best of Charlotte Church (2002)
Sancta Maria by Keedie Babb, on the album I Believe My Heart (2004)
Sancta Maria by Sissel Kyrkjebø, on the album Into Paradise (2006)
Sancta Maria by All Angels, on the album All Angels (2006)
Sancta Maria by Katherine Jenkins, on the album Rejoice (2007)
Sancta Maria by Blake, on the album And So It Goes (2008)
Sancta Maria by Patricia Janečková, on the album Patricia Janečková (2011)
Sancta Maria by Friar Alessandro, on the album Voice from Assisi (2012)
Sancta Maria (different version) by Enya, on the album Dark Sky Island (2015)
Sancta Maria by Tarja Turunen, on the album Ave Maria – En Plein Air (2015)
Sancta Maria by Amira Willighagen, on the album Merry Christmas (2015)

References

External links
Sissel Kyrkjebø - Sancta Maria
Andrea Bocelli - Sancta Maria
Charlotte Church - Sancta Maria
Katherine Jenkins - Sancta Maria

Christian prayer
Arias
Opera excerpts
1890 songs